dotXSI is an ASCII file format of Softimage Corporation for storing scene data. 

It includes support for meshes, NURBS, 2D and 3D chains, polygons, materials, hierarchies, skeletons, animation constraints, Hermite splines, custom effects, and user data. 

Common applications are architecture design and video games, becoming popular after Valve pioneered its use in Half-Life 2.

It was based on DirectX's X file format, and extended to handle much of those specific data structures.
The 'Crosswalk' SDK includes the ability to transfer data between dotXSI files and the formats of other autodesk products.

Computer file formats